Carlo Prinoth (born 20 June 1943) is an Italian luger. He competed in the men's singles event at the 1964 Winter Olympics.

References

External links
 

1943 births
Living people
Italian male lugers
Olympic lugers of Italy
Lugers at the 1964 Winter Olympics
People from Urtijëi
Sportspeople from Südtirol